The Up Here Festival is an annual art and music festival, staged each summer in Greater Sudbury, Ontario, Canada. Based on the theme of beautifying and transforming the city through public art, the festival blends the creation of new public murals and installation art projects with a lineup of musical performances.

The festival was launched by We Live Up Here, an arts organization which grew out of a 2012 book project by local artists Christian Pelletier and Andrew Knapp. It was also partially inspired by the Nuit Blanche model of art festivals, which make use of unexpected and non-traditional spaces to change the public's relationship with art, using the city's entire downtown core as a giant open-air venue.

2015
The festival was first staged in 2015; participating artists included Troy Lovegate, Labrona, Alexandra Mackenzie, Trevor Wheatley, Johanna Westby, Danielle Daniel, Nico Glaude and Alexandra Berens-Firth while the musical component was headlined by A Tribe Called Red, Tanya Tagaq and Suuns.

2016
Artists at the 2016 festival included Ella and Pitr, Ola Volo, Kirsten McCrea, Thesis Sahib, Hobz, Tracy Baker and Neli Nenkova, while performing musicians included Casper Skulls, Cris Derksen, Dilly Dally, Foxtrott, Holy Fuck, Hooded Fang, iskwē, Partner, Stars, U.S. Girls, Young Galaxy and Young Rival.

2017
Participating artists were Jarus and Mique Michelle as muralists, while local artists Kallie Berens-Firth, Sonia Ekiyor-Katimi, Melanie Gail St-Pierre, Madison Kotyluk, Bianca Lefebvre, Matti Lehtelä, Scott Minor, Maty Ralph, Jay Rice, Holly Robin, Julianne Steedman, Dani Taillefer and Isaac Weber participated in the Power Up Project to paint 24 downtown electrical boxes.

Performing musicians included The Fleshtones, Duchess Says, Deerhoof, Samito, Lido Pimienta and Yamantaka // Sonic Titan.

2018
Musical performers included Patrick Watson, Jeremy Dutcher, Venetian Snares, Daniel Lanois, Efrim Menuck, Frederick Squire, Random Recipe, The Sorority and Charlotte Day Wilson. Artists included Angela Perdue, Aidan Lucas, Maeve Macdonald, Birdo, Ben Johnston, Haley Rose, Johanna Westby, Kelly Barbosa, Kristina Rolander, Mariana Lafrance, Ness Lee, Sarah Blondin and Sarah Dempsey.

2019
The 2019 festival was noted for the creation, by graffiti artist RISK, of the largest public mural in Canada, at the disused St. Joseph's Health Centre site of Health Sciences North. Some specialized painting equipment was stolen from the site during the festival, but the mural was completed by August 31.

Performers included ESG, Snotty Nose Rez Kids, Milk & Bone, Hubert Lenoir, Yonatan Gat, Charlotte Cardin, Reykjavíkurdætur, Cartel Madras and Steve Lambke.

2020
Due to the COVID-19 pandemic in Canada, the musical component of the festival was not staged in 2020; however, various art and mural projects by artists such as Sonia Ekiyor-Katimi, Chantal Abdel-Nour, Ashley Guenette and Lümen Moratz were still undertaken.

2021
The 2021 festival was noted for the creation, by artist Kevin Ledo, of a mural memorializing Sudbury native Alex Trebek on the outer wall of Sudbury Secondary School. Other participating artists included Alex Berens, Tammy Gaber, Lauren Verwolf, Sarah Dempsey and DRPN Soul.

Performing musicians included Marie Davidson, NYSSA, The 555, Cadence Weapon, Naya Ali, Jor’Del Downz, Julie Katrinette, Casper Skulls and Zoon.

2022
For the first time in the history of the event, the 2022 festival allowed some of the older murals to be "retired" and painted over with new works. It also marked the addition of the city's new Place des Arts to the list of venues, and featured a Sunday afternoon "mystery tour", in which three outdoor musical venues would feature "pop-up" shows by musicians who were not announced in advance.

Performers included Absolutely Free, The Ape-ettes, aurel, Backxwash, DijahSB, DJ Redo, DJ Seith, Ellemetue, Emilio Portal, Exmiranda, Ghostly Kisses, Groovy Betty, Hippie Hourrah, Jane Inc., Jasmyn, Kimmortal, l’loop, La Luz, LaFHomme, Lee Paradise, Like a Girl, Louis Simão, Matt Foy, Maxwell José, OBUXUM, Peach Pact, Pierre Kwenders, Quintron and Miss Pussycat, Seulement, Sister Ray, Status/Non-Status, Thea May and Troy Junker, Tommy and the Commies, Uncle Stu, Will Powers, Wolf Saga and YONI. Art projects were by Alex Bierk, Anong Migwans Beam, Born in the North, Catdog3000, Christian Chapman, Lauren Verwolf, Luella, Maxine Lemieux, Melanie Vanco, Nico Glaude, Stephanie Babij, Stephanie Hrechka, Studio Nude Beach and the McEwen School of Architecture.

References

External links

Art festivals in Canada
Music festivals in Ontario
Festivals in Greater Sudbury